Wefaq Sabratha(وفاق صبراته) is a Libyan football club based in Sabratha, Libya.

During the 2006/07 season, Wefaq finished 3rd in Group A of the Libyan Second Division. The club had participated in the Libyan Premier League from the 2001/02 season until the 2005/06 season, at which point the club was relegated for finishing at the bottom of the league
. During season 2007/2008, Wefaq came second in Group A of the Libyan Second Division, and gained promotion to the LPL via the Relegation Play-Off League

Honours
 Play-Off – 2007–08

2008–09 season

Current squad
As of April 30, 2009

Backroom Staff

Results by Round

References

External links
Club Home Page (mainly in Arabic)

Wefaq Sabratha
Association football clubs established in 1957
1957 establishments in Libya